Iranildo Conceição Espíndola (born 24 January 1969) is a Brazilian para table tennis player who competes in international level events. He is a seven-time Parapan American Games champion and a four-time Pan American champion. He has participated at the Paralympic Games four times and has won one bronze medal.

References

1969 births
Living people
Paralympic table tennis players of Brazil
Table tennis players at the 2004 Summer Paralympics
Table tennis players at the 2008 Summer Paralympics
Table tennis players at the 2012 Summer Paralympics
Table tennis players at the 2016 Summer Paralympics
Medalists at the 2016 Summer Paralympics
Medalists at the 2007 Parapan American Games
Medalists at the 2011 Parapan American Games
Medalists at the 2015 Parapan American Games
Medalists at the 2019 Parapan American Games
Brazilian male table tennis players
21st-century Brazilian people